Mannadipattu Commune is located in India. Originally it was called "Tribuvane Commune", then renamed "Mannadipet Commune" (after liberation, by the Temporary United Government on 12 April 1954 in Tirubuvane). The liberation occurred while French India Government ruled over the French occupied Pondicherry regions. This event was a vital cause for liberation of entire French occupied Puducherry from French Administration.

Panchayat villages
The following are 16 panchayat villages under Mannadipattu Commune. 
 Chettipet
 Kalitheerthal Kuppam
 Katteri Kuppam
 Kodathur
 Kunichempet
 Madagadipet
 Mannadipattu
 Sandai Pudukuppam
 Saniyasi Kuppam
 Sellipattu
 Sorapattu
 Suthukeni
 Thirubuvanai
 Thirukkanur
 Thiruvandar Koil
 Puranasinga Palayam

References

External links
 Department of Revenue and Disaster Management, Government of Puducherry

Communes of Pondicherry